The following is a list of notable people whose state of origin is Ebonyi State, Nigeria.

A

 Chris Abani
 Anthony Agbo
 Anyim Pius Anyim, first president of the Nigerian Senate from Ebonyi State and first Secretary to Government of the Federation (SGF)  
 Uche Azikiwe, Professor and pioneer first lady of Nigeria and widow of Nigeria's first president Nnamdi Azikiwe

C
 Debbie Collins, Miss World 2016 Nigeria representative
 Andy Chukwu, actor, movie director
 Onyebuchi Chukwu, Professor, former Minister of Health of the Federal Republic of Nigeria (April 2010 - October 2014)

E
 Sam Egwu, first Civilian Governor of Ebonyi State
 Chacha Eke, actress
 Priscilla Ekwere Eleje
 Martin Elechi, former Governor of Ebonyi state (from 2007–2015)

I
 Akanu Ibiam, former Governor of Eastern Region, Nigeria and predecessor to Chukwuemeka Odumegwu Ojukwu

N
 Sylvanus Ngele, former Senator of the Federal Republic of Nigeria
 Nnenna Oti, Vice-Chancellor-elect of Federal University of Technology Owerri
 Nwali Sylvester Ngwuta, first Justice of the Supreme Court of Nigeria from Ebonyi State
 Igwe Aja-Nwachukwu, former Minister of Education
 Paulinus Igwe Nwagu, former Senator of the Federal Republic of Nigeria

O

 Joseph Ogba, Senator of the Federal Republic of Nigeria
 Elizabeth Ogbaga, former member House of Representative
 Chigozie Ogbu, Professor, former Deputy Governor of Ebonyi State and current Vice Chancellor Ebonyi State University Abakaliki
 John Ogbu, Nigerian American anthropologist, "acting white" theorist
 Frank Ogbuewu
 Sonni Ogbuoji, former Senator of the Federal Republic of Nigeria
 Michael Nnachi Okoro, the Bishop of the Roman Catholic Diocese of Abakaliki
 Angela Okorie, actress
 Francis Otunta, Professor and Vice Chancellor Michael Okpara University Umudike
 Ogbonnaya Onu, first Executive Governor of Abia State, current Minister for Science and Technology

P
 Patoranking, singer

S

 Cynthia Shalom, Actor, producer
 Sinach, gospel singer

T
 Tekno, singer, record producer, dancer

U
 Julius Ucha, former senator (from 2003–2011)
 Anyimchukwu Ude, former Senator of the Federal Republic of Nigeria
 Dave Umahi, current Executive Governor of Ebonyi State
 Vincent Obasi Usulor, former Senator of the Federal Republic of Nigeria

 
Ebonyi State